Alfred Elkins Pace (June 29, 1811 - January 20, 1868) was a Texas House member from late 1849 to late 1850.

Life
Pace was born on June 29, 1811, to Twitty Pace and Susannah Duncan. He is the oldest of 8 children. Not much information is known about his life from his birth until his marriage. He married Elizabeth Saphronia Hardaway on May 25, 1851, and had 5 children together between 1852-1860. He later died on January 20, 1868, at the age of 56.

References

1811 births
1868 deaths
Democratic Party members of the Texas House of Representatives
19th-century American politicians